Aimorés is a municipality in the countryside of Minas Gerais. It is located on the Rio Doce Valley, 440 km east to the capital of the state, Belo Horizonte. It has 1 348.913 km2 of area, with 8.2 km2 being in the urban perimeter. Its population size is of 25,141 habitants.
The town was founded on 18 September 1925.

Climate

References

Municipalities in Minas Gerais
Populated places established in 1925